Zoran Antić (born 7 February 1975) is a Serbian footballer

Born in Gnjilane, SAP Kosovo, SR Serbia, he previously played with FK Milicionar, FK Balkan Mirijevo, FK Radnički Niš, FK Hajduk Kula, FK Borac Čačak and FK Metalac Gornji Milanovac in the Serbian SuperLiga.

References

External links
 Early career clubs listed at EUFO
 Zoran Antić Stats at Utakmica.rs

1975 births
Living people
People from Gjilan
Kosovo Serbs
Serbian footballers
Association football defenders
FK Borac Čačak players
FK Milicionar players
FK Radnički Niš players
FK Hajduk Kula players
FK Metalac Gornji Milanovac players
Serbian SuperLiga players
FK Balkan Mirijevo players